is a Japanese manga comic created by Reibun Ike. Originally published by Libre in Japanese since 2019, it was later released in English by SuBLime, the boys' love imprint of Viz Media on May 11, 2021. The manga is set in a fictional island archipelago only recently discovered by the outside world, where a competition is held every four years to decide the new king. The competition is a fight between champions representing the eight clans, with the men who orgasm first losing the battle.

Plot
Dick Fight Island is set in Pulau Yong'Unda, a fictional archipelago made up of eight islands, that was not discovered by the outside world until the end of the 20th century. The king of the archipelago is decided in a contest held every four years called "The Great Wyrm Tournament", with each of the eight clans that make up the people of the archipelago sending out their own champion. The champions face each other in a series of one-on-one fights, the winner being the person who can make the other orgasm first. Thus, the champions go into their fights with armor that "was designed for the manhood, growing larger and more elaborate by the year." However, in keeping with local custom, the men wear clothes displaying the buttocks, this being considered a proud statement of manliness. The story's central character is Harto, a member of the Jewel Tribe, who has been studying abroad for four years and has returned to take part in the tournament. Harto has learned a "secret trick" that he hopes will allow him to win the tournament. Meanwhile, Harto's boyfriend, Matthew, follows him to Pulau Yong'Unda, jealous of the fact that Harto is being touched by other men.

The second volume explores the events following "The Great Wyrm Tournament," and the relationships that blossom as a result of the tournament's events.

Reception

The series has attracted positive reviews. Briana Lawrence writing for The Mary Sue, praised the premise, humor and plot. She wrote: "What really works for me with Dick Fight Island is that we, the readers, know this is an over-the-top idea, but the characters take great pride in what they do. To them, this is a legitimate fight for the crown and they've been training for this moment for years. And yes. The training is extremely sexual. ... I can't believe a manga with a title like Dick Fight Island amplified its premise with PLOT. It could've easily just thrown these men into an arena and had them clash their swords — which DOES happen, TRUST me — but the battles are made more interesting because as you read you realize, wow, this bonkers manga is actually giving a fantasy realm methodology behind "let's touch dicks." I have characters I want to keep up with and, oh my lord, do I have FAVORITES?! Who I am CONCERNED about?! And ROOTING FOR?!"

Writing for Anime News Network, Rebecca Silverman gave the first volume a rating of 3 out of 5 stars, saying: "It's actually kind of fun. It's not my usual thing, but it has a good sense of humor about its ludicrous factor (in fact, I'd argue that it's deliberately silly; just look at that dick armor – some of it has axe blades on it), and it feels like the creator has made an attempt to actually create a fantasy culture rather than letting the concept do all the work." In the same article, Lynzee Loveridge reviewed it, writing: "I laughed a handful of times and the art is all very attractive. So hey, this manga is exactly what it says on the tin and I appreciate its unabashed confidence." However, she did not give it a star rating arguing: "The very premise of a '1-5' system cannot account for things like cultural cock battles. Exactly what metric do we attribute to gladiator-style games of chicken where the first one to ejaculate loses?"

The first volume of Dick Fight Island released in English topped the Amazon best-seller charts in the "Romance Manga" and "Yaoi & LGBTQ+ Manga" categories, and was second in the "Action & Adventure Manga" category. Ike responded to the news by thanking fans on Twitter in English, and posting a GIF of one of the characters from the series.

The second volume released in English trended on Twitter when a display card at a branch of bookshop Barnes & Noble declared it was approved by the SpongeBob SquarePants character Squidward Tentacles. The volume topped the Amazon best-seller "Yaoi & LGBTQ+ Manga" chart.

References

Further reading
Dick Fight Island, Vol. 1, by Reibun Ike. Published in English by SuBLime Manga. Released May 11, 2021. ISBN 9781974717200

Other citations

External links
 
 Dick Fight Island on SuBLime Manga

Manga series
2019 manga
Adventure anime and manga
Comics set on islands
SuBLime manga
Yaoi anime and manga